The Canton of Lillebonne is a former canton situated in the Seine-Maritime département and in the Haute-Normandie region of northern France. It was disbanded following the French canton reorganisation which came into effect in March 2015. It had a total of 27,873 inhabitants (2012).

Geography 
An area of farming, light industry and oil refineries in the arrondissement of Le Havre, centred on the town of Lillebonne. The altitude varies from 0m (Lillebonne) to 154m (Auberville-la-Campagne) with an average altitude of 69m.

The canton comprised 14 communes:

Auberville-la-Campagne
La Frénaye
Grand-Camp
Lillebonne
Mélamare
Norville
Notre-Dame-de-Gravenchon
Petiville
Saint-Antoine-la-Forêt
Saint-Jean-de-Folleville
Saint-Maurice-d'Ételan
Saint-Nicolas-de-la-Taille
La Trinité-du-Mont
Triquerville

Population

See also 
 Arrondissements of the Seine-Maritime department
 Cantons of the Seine-Maritime department
 Communes of the Seine-Maritime department

References

Lillebonne
2015 disestablishments in France
States and territories disestablished in 2015